The VIA Inventory of Strengths (VIA-IS), formerly known as the "Values in Action Inventory," is a proprietary psychological assessment measure designed to identify an individual's profile of character strengths.

It was created by Christopher Peterson and Martin Seligman, researchers in the field of positive psychology, in order to operationalize their Character Strengths and Virtues Handbook (CSV).  The CSV is the positive psychology counterpart to the Diagnostic and Statistical Manual of Mental Disorders (DSM) used in traditional psychology. Unlike the DSM, which scientifically categorizes human deficits and disorders, the CSV classifies positive human strengths.  Moreover, the CSV is centered on helping people recognize and build upon their strengths.  This aligned with the overall goal of the positive psychology movement, which aims to make people's lives more fulfilling, rather than simply treating mental illness.  Notably, the VIA-IS is the tool by which people can identify their own positive strengths and learn how to capitalize on them.

Classification of strengths
 Wisdom and Knowledge: creativity, curiosity, judgment, love of learning, perspective
 Courage: bravery, perseverance, honesty, zest
 Humanity: love, kindness, social intelligence
 Justice: teamwork, fairness, leadership
 Temperance: forgiveness, humility, prudence, self-regulation
 Transcendence: appreciation of beauty and excellence, gratitude, hope, humor, spirituality

Composition and administration 
The VIA-IS is composed of a 240 item measure of 24 character strengths (10 items per strength). On average, an individual will complete the VIA-IS in 30 to 40 minutes.  Since 2001, the survey is available online for min $20 at www.viacharacter.org and over 400,000 people have participated so far.  Participants are instructed to answer each item on the VIA-IS in terms of “whether the statement describes what you are like”.  Participants respond according to a 5-point Likert scale ranging from (1= very much unlike me, 5= very much like me).  Sample items include “I find the world a very interesting place”, which gauges curiosity, and “I always let bygone be bygones”, which gauges forgiveness.  People can score anywhere from 10 to 50 points for each of the 24 strengths.  Moreover, a higher score on a scale indicates that the participant more strongly identifies with that scale's associated strength.  Score reports are delivered to each participant at the completion of the survey.  Feedback is provided for the signature strengths, but not for the lesser strengths.  The results rank order the participant's strengths from 1-24, with the top 4-7 strengths considered “signature strengths”.

History 
As a relatively new field of research, positive psychology lacked a common vocabulary for discussing measurable positive traits before 2004.  Traditional psychology benefited from the creation of DSM, as it provided researchers and clinicians with the same set of language from which they could talk about the negative.  As a first step in remedying this disparity between tradition and positive psychology, Peterson and Seligman set out to identify, organize and measure character.

Peterson & Seligman began by defining the notion of character as traits that are possessed by an individual and are stable over time, but can still be impacted by setting and thus are subject to change.  The researchers then started the process of identifying character strengths and virtues by brainstorming with a group of noted positive psychology scholars.  Then, Peterson & Seligman examined ancient cultures (including their religions, politics, education and philosophies) for information about how people in the past construed human virtue.  The researchers looked for virtues that were present across cultures and time.  Six core virtues emerged from their analysis: courage, justice, humanity, temperance, transcendence and wisdom.

Next, Peterson and Seligman proposed a model of classification which includes horizontal and vertical components.  The hierarchical system is modeled after the Linnaean classification of species, which ranges from a specific species to more general and broad categories. The scientists stated the six core values are the broadest category and are, “core characteristics valued by moral philosophers and religious thinkers” (p. 13).  Peterson and Seligman then moved down the hierarchy to identifying character strengths, which are, “the psychological processes or mechanisms that define the virtues” (p. 13).

The researchers began the process of identifying individual character strengths by brainstorming with a group of noted positive psychology scholars.  This exercise generated a list of human strengths, which were helpful when consulting with Gallup Organization.  Peterson and Seligman then performed an exhaustive literature search for work that directly addresses good character in the domains of, “psychiatry, youth development, philosophy and psychology” (p. 15).  Some individuals who influenced Peterson and Seligman's choice of strengths include: Abraham Maslow, Erik Erikson, Ellen Greenberger, Marie Jahoda, Carol Ryff, Michael Cawley, Howard Gardner, Shalom Schwartz.  In an effort to leave no stone unturned, the researchers also looked for virtue-laden messages in popular culture.  For example, the researchers examined Hallmark greeting cards, personal ads, graffiti, bumper stickers and profiles of Pokémon characters.

After identifying dozens of ‘candidate strengths’, the researchers needed to find a way to further refine their list.  Therefore, Peterson & Seligman developed a list of 10 criteria (e.g., strengths must contribute to a sense of a fulfilling life, must be intrinsically valuable) to help them select the final 24 strengths for the CSV (see CSV for complete list of criteria).  Approximately half of the strengths included in the CSV meet all 10 criteria, and half do not.  By looking for similarities between candidate strengths, the researchers distributed 24 character strengths between six virtue categories.  Only after creating this a priori organization of traits, the researchers performed, “an exploratory factor analysis of scale scores using varimax rotation,” (p. 632) from which five factors emerged.  Peterson & Seligman state that they are not as concerned with how the 24 strengths are grouped into virtue clusters because, in the end, these traits are mixed together to form the character of a person.

Validity and reliability 
Peterson and Seligman state that all character strengths must be measurable.  Of the 24 strengths, most can be assessed using self-report questionnaires, behavioral observation, peer-report methods and clinical interviews.  Three strengths, however, have yet to be reliably assessed: humility, modesty and bravery.  The researchers acknowledge that some strengths are more difficult to assess than others, therefore methods of assessing these strengths are still in-progress.

For each strength, there are typically several measures that could be administered in order to assess a person's trait level for that strength.   Time and energy, however, prohibit administering all of the measures for the 24 strengths in one testing session.  To solve this problem, Peterson & Seligman designed a new measure, the VIA-IS, to assess all 24 strengths in relatively brief amount of time.  Beginning in the fall of 2000, the researchers pilot tested the VIA-IS with a group of 250 adults.  The researchers removed items that correlated poorly with the rest of the items in the same scale of interest.  Peterson & Seligman repeated this process until Cronbach's alpha for all scales exceeded .70.  Along the way, the researchers added in 3 reverse-scored items in each of the 24 scales as well.  For the current version of the VIA-IS, test-retest correlations for all scales during a 4-month period are > .70.

Peterson & Seligman (2004) provide limited data on the validity and reliability of the VIA-IS.  In fact, the only published statistics are stated above. The researchers say that they will provide the full statistical results of their analysis of the VIA-IS in a future publication.  However, other researchers have published studies that challenge the validity of this 6 factor structure.

Empirical findings and limitations
Although researchers have not yet examined the validity and reliability of the VIA-IS, they are beginning to look at how the 24 character strengths are distributed within the United States and international populations.  Researchers found that, within the United States, the most commonly endorsed strengths are kindness, fairness, honesty, gratitude and judgment.  The lesser strengths demonstrated consistency across states and regions as well: prudence, modesty and self-regulation.  The researchers did not find regional differences in the rank-order of strengths, with the exception of the South demonstrating slightly higher scores for religiousness.

When the rank order of strengths in the U.S. is compared to that of 53 other countries, scientists found the relative pattern of rank ordering did not differ.  This finding provides evidence to support Peterson & Seligman's (2004) assertion that their classification system is composed of universally acknowledged strengths.

The results of this study do have limitations.  More specifically, respondents to the survey must speak English, as the VIA-IS was not translated into each respondent's native language.  This may restrict the extension of these results to non-English speakers.

In an earlier study, researchers administered the English-language version of the VIA-IS to individuals in 40 countries (Steen, Park & Peterson, 2005; in Park, Peterson & Seligman, 2005).  Worldwide, the following strengths were most associated with positive life satisfaction: hope, zest, gratitude and love.  The researchers called these strengths of the heart'.  Moreover, strengths associated with knowledge, such as love of learning and curiosity, were least correlated with life satisfaction.

United Kingdom 
Scientists have also performed more in-depth analyses of the VIA-IS when it is applied to populations outside of the United States.  Unlike Park, Peterson & Seligman (2006), Linley and colleagues (2007) did not simply compare the rank-order of strengths of the U.S. to other countries.  Linley and colleagues (2007) administered the VIA-IS to 17,056 individuals living in the United Kingdom between 2002 & 2005.  Compared to the entire U.K. population, the study's sample was better educated, composed of more women and fewer elderly individuals.

The researchers found that as people aged, strength scores tended to increase.  Using Pearson's correlations, researchers looked for associations between age and strengths.  The following strengths showed the strongest correlations: love of learning, curiosity, forgiveness, self-regulation and fairness.  Humor, however, did not follow this pattern and was negatively correlated with age.

In terms of statistically significant gender differences, women demonstrated higher scores for interpersonal strengths (kindness, love and social intelligence) and appreciation of beauty and gratitude.  Men scored significantly higher than women on creativity. For men and women, four of the top five signature strengths were the same: open-mindedness, fairness, curiosity and love of learning.

When the means and standard deviations were broken down by gender and age, they were consistent with those reported by U.S. samples.  The rank ordering of strengths were comparable to the patterns found in the U.S. and other international samples.  Once again, research supports Peterson & Seligman's (2004) assertion that the strengths listed in the CSV and VIA-IS are present in the majority of cultures.

An important limitation of this study, as with all studies that collect data via the internet, is that the samples tend to be more educated and from higher socioeconomic background because these individuals are more likely to have access and knowledge of the internet.

Japan 
Unlike previous studies, Shimai and colleagues (2007) tested the applicability of a translated version of the VIA-IS to a sample in Japan.  The researchers administered the VIA-IS to 308 young adults from Japan and 1099 young adults from the U.S.  The scientists translated the VIA-IS into Japanese and then back to English in order to be examined by the original creators of the VIA-IS.  They confirmed that the Japanese version of the VIA-IS demonstrated face validity, test-retest reliability and internal consistency before administering it to young adults.

The researchers found that top-ranked strengths (in terms of prevalence) for young adults in Japan, were similar to those of young adults in the U.S.  The percentage of people who scored high or low on each character strength were similar between the two countries.  Moreover, the scientists did not find a significant variation in the pattern of gender differences between the United States and Japan. Women in both countries were more likely than men to score highly on the strengths of kindness, love, gratitude, teamwork and appreciation of beauty, whereas men in both countries were more likely score highly on the strengths of open-mindedness, perspective, creativity, self-regulation and bravery.  The correlations between specific strengths and happiness outcomes were consistent as well.  More specifically, the strengths of zest, curiosity, gratitude, and hope were significantly positively correlated with subjective measures of happiness for both populations.

Differences between the young adults in Japan and the U.S. emerged as well.  The rank-order of religiousness was the biggest difference between the cultures.  For American young adults, religiousness was on average, the 14th most prevalent strength.  For Japanese young adults, religiousness was, on average, the 19th most prevalent strength.  The researchers attributed this finding to the fact that some of the items on the VIA-IS that assess religiousness were based on Western connotations of religiosity (e.g. monotheistic traditions).

A notable limitation of this study is that the researchers examined young adults, rather than the population at-large.  According to the researchers, young adults in Japan are more active participants in a more global, Americanized culture than the older generations.  This could explain the commonalities found between young adults in Japan and the US.

Overall, Shimai and colleagues demonstrated that the VIA-IS can be successfully and accurately translated into other languages.  When this is done, however, researchers will need to ensure that the items on the scale are not culturally biased toward Western concepts.

Character Strengths and Virtues

Character Strengths and Virtues (CSV) is a book by Christopher Peterson and Martin Seligman (2004) that attempts to present a  measure of humanist ideals of virtue in an empirical,  rigorously scientific manner, intended to provide a theoretical framework for practical applications for positive psychology. CSV identifies six classes of virtue (i.e. "core virtues") comprising 24 measurable "character strengths". The organization of the six virtues and 24 strengths is as follows:

 Wisdom and Knowledge: creativity, curiosity, open-mindedness, love of learning, perspective
 Courage: bravery, persistence, integrity, zest
 Humanity: love, kindness, social intelligence
 Justice: teamwork, fairness, leadership
 Temperance: forgiveness and mercy, humility, prudence, self control
 Transcendence: appreciation of beauty and excellence, gratitude, hope, humor, spirituality

CSV in its opening chapter defined character strengths as satisfying most of the ten following criteria: 

 contributes to individual fulfillment "for oneself and others";
 intrinsically valuable, in an ethical sense (gifts, skills, aptitudes, and expertise can be squandered, but character strengths and virtues cannot);
 non-rivalrous;
 not the opposite of a desirable trait (a counterexample is steadfast and flexible, which are opposites but are both commonly seen as desirable);
 trait-like (habitual patterns that are relatively stable over time);
 not a combination of the other character strengths in the CSV;
 personified (at least in the popular imagination) by people made famous through story, song, etc.;
 observable in child prodigies (though this criterion is not applicable to all character strengths);
 absent in some individuals;
 and nurtured by societal norms and institutions.

The introduction of CSV suggests that these six virtues are considered good by the vast majority of cultures and throughout history and that practicing these traits leads to increased happiness. Notwithstanding numerous caveats, this suggestion of universality hints that in addition to trying to broaden the scope of psychological research to include mental wellness, the leaders of the positive psychology movement are challenging moral relativism and suggesting that virtue has a biological basis. These arguments are in line with the science of morality.

Each of the 24 character traits is defined behaviorally, with psychometric evidence demonstrating that it can be reliably measured. The book shows that "empirically minded humanists can measure character strengths and virtues in a rigorous scientific manner."

Practical applications of positive psychology include helping individuals and organizations correctly identify their strengths and use them to increase and sustain their respective levels of well-being. Each trait "provides one of many alternative paths to virtue and well-being." Therapists, counselors, coaches, and various other psychological professionals can use the new methods and techniques to build and broaden the lives of individuals who are not necessarily suffering from mental illness or disorder.

Finally, other researchers have advocated grouping the 28 identified character traits into just four classes of strength (Intellectual, Social, Temperance, Transcendent) or even just three classes (without Transcendence). Not only is this easier to remember, but additionally there is evidence that these adequately capture the components of the 28 original traits.

Perspective and wisdom (personified for example by Ann Landers): the coordination of "knowledge and experience" and "its deliberate use to improve wellbeing." Many, but not all, studies find that adults' self-ratings of perspective/wisdom do not depend on age. This stands in contrast to the popular notion that wisdom increases with age.

Applications 

One of the major goals of positive psychology is to help people “cultivate and sustain the good life” (p. 640).  The creation of the VIA-IS provides a practical measure that can be used to evaluate the efficacy of these positive interventions.  As one example, consider the thousands of people participate in life coaching and character education programs every year (Eccles & Gootman, 2002; in Peterson & Seligman, 2004).  Strengths of character are often the outcome of interest, yet these programs do not employ a rigorous outcome measure in order to gauge efficacy.  Researchers propose that if these programs used the VIA-IS, then they may discover unanticipated benefits of their interventions and would facilitate objective evaluation of its outcome.

Peterson & Seligman (2004) suggest that the VIA-IS could be used as a way to help people identify their signature strengths.  With this knowledge, people could then begin to capitalize and build upon their signature strengths.  Positive psychologists argue that the VIA-IS should not be used as a way to identify your ‘lesser strengths’ or weaknesses.  Their approach departs from the medical model of traditional psychology, which focuses on fixing deficits.  In contrast, positive psychologists emphasize that people should focus and build upon what they are doing well.

Criticism 
Many studies have checked the factor structure of the CSV, on which the VIA-IS is based.

Using a second order factor analysis, Macdonald & colleagues (2008) found that the 24 strengths did not fit into the 6 higher order virtues model proposed in the CSV. None of the clusters of characters strengths that they found resembled the structure of the 6 virtue clusters of strengths.  The researchers noted that many of the VIA character strengths cross-loaded onto multiple factors.  Rather, the strengths were best represented by a one and four factor model. A one factor model would mean that the strengths are best accounted for by, “one overarching factor,” such as a global trait of character (p. 797).  A four factor model more closely resembles the 'Big Five' model of personality. The character strengths in the four factor model could be organized into the following four groups: Niceness, Positivity, Intellect and Conscientiousness.

Peterson and Seligman (2004) conducted a factor analysis and found that a five factor model, rather than their 6 hierarchical virtues model, best organized the strengths. Their study, however, did not include five of the character strengths in the results of their analysis. The researchers most likely did this because their results were plagued by the problem of strengths cross-loading on to multiple factors, similar to what occurred in Macdonald and colleagues (2008) study. Clearly, empirical evidence casts doubt on the link proposed by Peterson & Seligman (2004) between the 24 strengths and associated 6 higher order virtues.

Brdar & Kashdan (2009) used more precise statistical tools to build upon the findings of the two earlier studies.  They found that a four factor model (Interpersonal Strengths, Vitality, Fortitude and Cautiousness) explained 60% of the variance.  One large, overarching factor explained 50% of the variance.  The four factors found by Brdar and Kashdan (2009) are similar to the four factors found by Macdonald and colleagues (2008). Once again, the Brdar and Kashdan found that the 24 strengths did not fall into the 6 higher order virtues proposed by Peterson and Seligman (2004).  The correlations found between many of the strengths demonstrates that each strength is not distinct, which contradicts the claims made by the creators of the VIA-IS.

McGrath (2014) modified the inventory by adding four new scales (Positivity, Future-Mindedness, Receptivity, Intellectual Pursuits) and removing four previous scales of Leadership, Zest, Hope and Gratitude. He suggested five virtues (second-order factors) instead of six hypothesized virtues by Peterson and Seligman (2004). These virtues were: Interpersonal, Emotional, Intellectual, Restraint, and Future Orientation. These factors / virtues resembled the ones identified in previous factor-analytic studies which have found very different factor structures than the ones hypothesized theoretically. Therefore, substantial evidence stands against original scale structures, in terms of nature of factors and their structures regarding content of items. McGrath (2014) also found that a lot of items that were part of original character strengths inventory (VIA-IS) were no more belonging to the same scales after confirmatory factor alayses. His new scales had some overlaps with previous scales, but had many new items from other scales that loaded onto them instead of previous ones. Mcgrath indicated that the original scale structure needs several modifications and future studies would yield a better structure for a second-generation model of strengths.

Caution should be taken in interpreting the results from these four studies as their samples differ in age and country of origin.

See also 
Appreciative inquiry
Cardinal virtues
Happiness
Flow
Broaden-and-build
Meaning of life
Positive psychology
Science of morality
Strengths and weaknesses (personality)
Value (personal and cultural)—the principles, standards, or quality which guides human actions
Virtue ethics
Aristotle's Nicomachean Ethics
Aquinas's Summa Theologica

References

External links
 Character strengths and virtues: A handbook and classification
 Values in Action website
 authentichappiness.com for VIA online strengths diagnosis questionnaire (registration required)

Moral psychology
Positive psychology
Psychological tests and scales